Muğla is an electoral district of the Grand National Assembly of Turkey. It elects sıx members of parliament (deputies) to represent the province of the same name for a four-year term by the D'Hondt method, a party-list proportional representation system.

Members 
Population reviews of each electoral district are conducted before each general election, which can lead to certain districts being granted a smaller or greater number of parliamentary seats. Muğla has elected six MPs to parliament for almost twenty years.

General elections

2011

Presidential elections

2014

References 

Electoral districts of Turkey
Politics of Muğla Province